Love & Loss is an outdoor 2005 mixed-media installation by Roy McMakin, installed at Olympic Sculpture Park in Seattle, Washington.

See also
 2005 in art

References

2005 in art
2005 works
Olympic Sculpture Park